State Bank of Bikaner & Jaipur (SBBJ) was a major Indian bank. It was a subsidiary of State Bank of India, with which it was merged on 31 March 2017. As of 2015, SBBJ had 1,360 branches, mostly located in the state of Rajasthan, India. Its branch network out of Rajasthan covered all the major business centers of India. In 1997, the bank entered the capital market with an initial public offering of 1,360,000 shares at a premium of Rs. 440 per share. For the year 2015-16 the net profit of the company was Rs. 8.5 billion.

History

State Bank of Bikaner & Jaipur came into existence on 1963 when two banks, namely, State Bank of Bikaner (established in 1944) and State Bank of Jaipur (established in 1943), were merged. Both these banks were subsidiaries of the State Bank of India under the State Bank of India (Subsidiary Bank) Act, 1959.

On 25 April 1966 SBBJ took over Govind Bank (Private) Ltd., Mathura, established on 8 February 1963.

In 1984 SBBJ sponsored and established Ganganagar Kshetriya Gramin Bank as a Regional Rural Bank. Thereafter, in 1985 SBBJ opened the Bikaner Kshetriya Gramin Bank, the second Regional Rural Bank sponsored by it. The third Regional Rural Bank, sponsored by SBBJ was Marwar Gramin Bank, which covered the districts of Pali, Jalore and Sirohi. On 12 June 2006, SBBJ merged all three regional rural banks that it sponsored under the name MGB Gramin Bank, with headquarters in Jodhpur.

The plans to make SBI one of the top 50 banks in India affected SBBJ very much. In 2016, the plan to merge SBBJ with its five co-subsidiaries was made, and it was ratified by the Government of India on 15 February 2017. It finally merged with SBI on 31 March 2017.

References

External links
 SBBJ official website

State Bank of India
Banks established in 1963
Companies based in Rajasthan
Economy of Jaipur
Defunct banks of India
Indian companies established in 1963
1963 establishments in Rajasthan
2017 disestablishments in India
Companies listed on the National Stock Exchange of India
Companies listed on the Bombay Stock Exchange